The Masalembu Islands (Indonesian:Kepulauan Mesalembu) lie in the Java Sea to the north of Madura, about halfway between Madura and Borneo.  They administratively form Masalembu District (kecamatan) of Sumenep Regency of Madura, in the Indonesian province of East Java.  The Madurese language is spoken on the islands.  The three main islands are Masalembu Island, Masakambing Island, and Karamian Island.  The land area of the district is 40.85 square km, and they had a population of 20,687 people in the 2000 census, increasing to 21,705 at the 2010 Census and to 25,809 at the 2020 Census.

Main Islands

Masalembu Island 
Masalembu Island is close to the equator, exhibiting a habitat supportive of rich biodiversity, with corals reefs, mangroves, algae forests, and upwelling areas with the capacities to sustain fisheries and other highly valuable economic activities.

Masakambing Island 
Masakambing Island is about 10 miles north of Masalembu Island. It occupies an area of around 3.18 km2 and has one village, Masakambing Village, with a population of 1,268 inhabitants in 2000.

Keramaian Island 
The island is approximately 29 miles to the north of Masalembu Island, has an area of about 9.79 km2 and is occupied by one village, namely the Village of Kersatria, with a population in 2000 of 3,287 inhabitants.

References

Archipelagoes of Indonesia